Masquerade Show is the debut album of the Japanese rock group Show-Ya. The album was released on 6 September 1985 in Japan. Its release was preceded by the pop single "Suteki ni Dancing" (trans. Dancing Is Great), used for an advertising campaign by Coca-Cola.

Overview
The single "Suteki ni Dancing", used for the TV spots of the Coca-Cola campaign, gave the band a wide and immediate visibility all over Japan. A Coca-Cola can is depicted on the back cover of the album to remind the link to the band's sponsor. The album, mixed at Abbey Road Studios in London by Haydn Bendall (Camel, Alan Parsons Project, Kate Bush, Toyah) and the Japanese media coverage of the event, pushed the band to an even higher level of popularity. During their sojourn in London, Show-Ya had the occasion to play live in the clubs that usually hosted bands from the new wave of British heavy metal scene, making their name known to the British musical press.

The album presents a large variety of compositions, ranging from pop rock to hard rock, showing the classic rock influences of the young musicians but a sound not yet distinctive. Mixing the album, a large emphasis was generally given to vocals and keyboards, keeping the volume of the guitars very low. The result is a distinctly soft tone, quite different from the loud live performances of the band. "Talon of King" is an adaptation of a song from Japanese metal band Helen and "Touch Me" is a cover of The Doors' song from the album The Soft Parade. The title of the song "Touch Down" was adopted by Show-Ya's official fan club.

Track listing
Side one
"Touch Down" (Show-Ya) – 4:51
"Mado" (マドゥー) (Tetsurō Oda, Keiko Terada) – 4:23
"Talon of King" (ターロン・オブ・キング（爪王）) (HELEN, Terada & HELEN) – 4:46
"Au Revoir (Last Scene)" (Miki Nakamura, Terada) – 5:21

Side two
"Mind Collection" (Kenshi Arai, Terada) – 4:47
"Actor" (Yū Izawa, Terada) – 4:41
"Touch Me" (Robby Krieger) – 3:12
"Masquerade" (Arai, Terada) – 4:05
"Hurry Up" (Show-Ya) – 4:14

Personnel

Band members
Keiko Terada – vocals
Miki Igarashi – guitars, guitar synth, backing vocals
Miki Nakamura – keyboards, backing vocals
Satomi Senba – bass
Miki Tsunoda – drums and electronic percussion

Production
Hiroaki Takei, Akira Tanaka – producers
Kenshi Arai, Takayuki Negishi, Hide Inoura & Show-Ya – arrangements
Seizi Yamazaki – engineer
Fujieda Darling Godwin – assistant engineer
Haydn Bendall – remix engineer

References

External links
Show-Ya discography 

Show-Ya albums
1985 debut albums
EMI Records albums
Japanese-language albums